Gustav Kampendonk (30 May 1909 – 29 June 1966) was a German screenwriter. He wrote for 90 films between 1939 and 1966. He was born in Hoengen, Germany and died in Berlin, Germany.

Selected filmography

 Three Fathers for Anna (1939)
 The Wedding Hotel (1944)
 Summer Nights (1944)
 Morituri (1948)
 Only One Night (1950)
 The Girl from the South Seas (1950)
 The Woman from Last Night (1950)
 Furioso (1950)
 Die Tödlichen Träume (1951)
 You Have to be Beautiful (1951)
 The Thief of Bagdad (1952)
 I Lost My Heart in Heidelberg (1952)
 Lady's Choice (1953)
 On the Reeperbahn at Half Past Midnight (1954)
 The Three from the Filling Station (1955)
 The Happy Village (1955)
 Love Is Just a Fairytale (1955)
 Yes, Yes, Love in Tyrol (1955)
 The Stolen Trousers (1956)
 The Daring Swimmer (1957)
 Peter Voss, Thief of Millions (1958)
 It Happened Only Once (1958)
 Peter Shoots Down the Bird (1959)
Triplets on Board (1959)
 Freddy, the Guitar and the Sea (1959)
 Peter Voss, Hero of the Day (1959)
 La Paloma (1959)
 Of Course, the Motorists (1959)
 Freddy and the Melody of the Night (1960)
 The Avenger (1960)
 Ramona (1961)
 Robert and Bretram (1961)
 I Must Go to the City (1962)
 The Strangler of Blackmoor Castle (1963)
 Freddy in the Wild West (1964)
 Golden Goddess of Rio Beni (1964)
 The Heath Is Green (1972)

References

External links

1909 births
1966 deaths
German male screenwriters
German male writers
People from Aachen (district)
Film people from North Rhine-Westphalia
20th-century German screenwriters